Total Eclipse is a generic tabletop role-playing game published in 2011 by Shrapnel Games and written by Steve N. Jackson.  The first edition of the game is set in the world of Virdea.

Total Eclipse is somewhat notable in that it is published with tablets and other e-readers in mind, being formatted in such a way that it is easier to read on such devices.

External links
 http://www.digitallydownloaded.net/2011/09/shrapnel-games-to-bring-pen-and-paper.html

Role-playing games introduced in 2011